Kane Phillips is a fictional character from the Australian Channel Seven soap opera Home and Away, played by Sam Atwell. He first appeared during the episode airing on 9 April 2001 and made his final appearance on 5 March 2009.

In 2004, viewers saw Kane undergo a battle with testicular cancer.

Storylines

2001-05

Kane is first seen in school at Summer Bay High, when a group of Year 9 students talk about a Dance party he is hosting. Kane tries to woo one of his teachers, Shauna Bradley (Kylie Watson) by getting her tickets to see Savage Garden in concert but she declines. Kane's brother, Scott (Nathaniel Dean) kidnaps Shauna and Kane is forced into being an accessory, however, he later saves Shauna.

Kane tries his luck with Dani Sutherland (Tammin Sursok), who is currently on a break from Will Smith (Zac Drayson). This leads to Kane raping Dani one day while they are alone at her house. Will finds out and starts a fight with Kane but is jumped by several of Kane's friends. Local headmaster Donald Fisher (Norman Coburn) intervenes but is given a kicking for his troubles. Kane stands trial with Morag Bellingham (Cornelia Frances) presiding as the judge and is found not guilty, leaving Dani distraught. After Kane tearfully apologises to Dani, he leaves the bay.

The following year, Kane returns to the bay and  agrees to a mediation session with Dani and local counsellor Flynn Saunders (Martin Dingle-Wall). This fails when Dani refuses to forgive him as she is still having nightmares. Kane later takes a job aboard a boat named The Mirgini which is to set sail for the sesquicentenary celebrations of Summer Bay. It doesn't sit well when Dani's family and boyfriend Josh West (Daniel Collopy) discover this. The boat begins sinking and Kane is washed up on a deserted beach with Dani's mother Shelley (Paula Forrest) and sister Kirsty for a week. Kane saves Shelley from a snake and the three of them are eventually rescued.

Kane begins a relationship with Kirsty, which they must keep secret. Eventually, Shelley finds out and tells her husband, Rhys (Michael Beckley) and he warns Kane off. The couple then run away as they can't live without each other. While on the run, Kane struggles to find them work and Kirsty is nearly sexually assaulted by a drunk. Kane realises he has to take Kirsty back home, but she refuses. Kane, being cruel to be kind, calls her a kid and throws her out of his car.

Kane soon returns to win Kirsty back.Seb Miller (Mitch Firth), Kirsty's current boyfriend takes exception to Kane and punches him. Kirsty can't fight her feelings for Kane and they reunite, breaking Seb's heart. When Kane and Kirsty become common knowledge once more,  Dani decides to accept it as she feels trying to keeping them apart will only bring them closer together. When Dani drives back from university one night, she runs over Kane. Kane is rushed to hospital and Kirsty arrives by his bedside keeping a constant vigil. Kane cannot remember the whole story at first but eventually tells the police. Kane wants Kirsty to use his version of events when questioned but the police question Kirsty at home. Dani later stands trial, with Morag as the judge once again. When the prosecutor insinuates that Dani wanted to kill Kane, she breaks down on the stand admitting so. The jury render a verdict of guilty and Dani is imprisoned. Kane leaves town in the aftermath of the trial for a while. After the Sutherlands fall into a mineshaft, Kane is accused. He helps with the search and manages to dig the family out, injuring his hands in the process. In spite of this, Rhys is still frosty with Kane.

Kane later proposes to Kirsty and she accepts. Their secret wedding is held on the same day as Rhys' wedding to Beth Hunter (Clarissa House). Irene Roberts (Lynne McGranger) offers the couple a room with her at the beach house. Kirsty later tells Kane she is pregnant with his baby but this is revealed to be a lie. Kane nearly strikes Kirsty during an argument, and she flees and when she returns, Kirsty takes out an AVO against Kane. They reconcile and Kirsty does fall pregnant for real but tragically miscarries.

Sarah Lewis (Luisa Hastings-Edge) tells Kirsty Kane is cheating on her but he denies it.  Kane and Kirsty are drawn into a hostage situation with Sarah and several other Summer Bay residents which culminates in Sarah shooting Noah Lawson (Beau Brady) dead before committing suicide. Several weeks later, Kane discovers he has testicular cancer but decides to keep it quiet as Kirsty is taking her HSC. He tells Flynn, a doctor and his wife, Sally Fletcher (Kate Ritchie) that he plans to tell Kirsty that he is going away on a boat trip for a week so she will not suspect he is having an operation. Kirsty eventually finds out and stands by him.

Kane is shocked when his father Gus (Peter Lamb) reappears in his life and is very hostile towards him as Scott had beaten him in his childhood. After Kirsty convinced Kane to give his father a second chance, Kane find himself framed for a robbery that he didn't commit. Kane tries to contact Gus via an incarcerated Scott (now played by Josh Rosenthal) but gets nowhere. Morag, who previously ruled in Kane's favor twice before in court, defends him. The evidence is stacked against Kane and Scott lies during his testimony, exacerbating Kane's plight. Before the jury return a verdict, Kane tells Kirsty to pack and they flee the bay, with Kirsty several months pregnant.

2008-09

Three years on, Irene receives a mysterious phone call and goes to meet Kirsty. She agrees to look after Kane and Kirsty's son, Oliver (Oliver Davis), who is now three years old. Kane later turns up at the beach house who tells her that he and Kirsty want her to raise Oliver, as being on the run is no place for a child. Kirsty wants to give herself up after being on the run, but unknown to her, Kane robs the diner and attempts turn over a jewelry store in Yabbie Creek but is stopped by Larry Jefferies (Paul Gleason). Ric Dalby (Mark Furze) discovers Kane but is held at gunpoint.

Irene realises Oliver is missing and figures Kane and Kirsty are fleeing again. Officers Jack Holden (Paul O'Brien) and Lara Fitzgerald (Rebecca George) begin a car chase with Kane and Kirsty. The car is found abandoned and the police eventually corner Kane. After being quizzed about his crimes, it transpires that Kane has pulled several robberies across several states. Morag agrees to represent Kane but he decides to accept a deal to plead guilty to all charges in exchange for the exoneration of Irene and Kirsty. Kane is then jailed. Months later, Kane sends Kirsty a letter begging her to help him with money to fund an appeal and regular letters are exchanged between the two as Kirsty tries find the money for him.

At end of the year, a delighted Oliver runs into Kane at the Caravan Park and Kane asks him to lie to Kirsty about seeing him. Oliver can't keep it a secret but Kirsty and her new partner Miles Copeland (Josh Quong Tart) don't believe him, thinking he is just missing his Father. When Kane arrives, Miles and Kirsty are shocked.

Kane tries to win Kirsty back but is turned down. He tries again on the night of the school formal and is rejected again. Teenagers Jai Fernandez (Jordan Rodrigues) and Annie Campbell (Charlotte Best) ask Kane for a lift to look for Melody Jones (Celeste Dodwell), who has recently left a mental institute. They find Melody in the middle of the road, Kane swerves to avoid her and ends up crashing into the Diner, injuring himself and several other attendees of the formal. Kane recovers in hospital and asks Kirsty to leave with him, which she does after ending things with Miles. In a matter of weeks, Kane and Kirsty are back and they are having some problems. Kane later punches Miles, which Jai and Oliver witness. Kane concedes defeat when he realizes Kirsty no longer loves him and leaves for his new job alone.

References

External links
 Character profile at the Official AU Home and Away website

Home and Away characters
Fictional criminals in soap operas
Fictional rapists
Male villains
Television characters introduced in 2001
Male characters in television